Bierzyn may refer to the following places in Poland:
Bierzyn, Lower Silesian Voivodeship (south-west Poland)
Bierzyn, Kuyavian-Pomeranian Voivodeship (north-central Poland)